2 Piscis Austrini, also known as HD 200763 or simply 2 PsA,  is a solitary orange hued star located in the southern constellation Microscopium. It was once part of Piscis Austrinus, the southern fish. The object has an apparent magnitude of 5.2, making it faintly visible to the naked eye under ideal conditions. Based on parallax measurements from the Gaia satellite, it is estimated to be 354 light years away from the Solar System. At its current distance, 2 PsA's brightness is diminished by 0.11 magnitudes due to interstellar dust. It has an absolute magnitude of 0.19.

This is an evolved star with a stellar classification of either K2 III or K3 III. Nevertheless, both indicate that the object is a red giant.  2 PsA is estimated to be 930 million years old, enough time for it to cool and expand to 16.4 times the Sun's radius. It is currently on the horizontal branch (HB), generating energy through helium fusion at its core. The star is located in a metal rich region of the HB called the red clump.

References

K-type giants
Horizontal-branch stars
Microscopium
CD-32 16398
Piscis Austrini, 02
200763
104174
8076
Microscopii, 49